Marc Potvin (January 29, 1967 – January 13, 2006) was a Canadian professional ice hockey player who played 121  games in the National Hockey League (NHL) between 1990 and 1996. The rest of his career, which lasted from 1990 to 1998, was mainly spent in the minor American Hockey League (AHL). After his playing career Potvin became a coach in the minor leagues, until his suicide in 2006. He was the cousin of Denis Potvin and Jean Potvin.

Playing career
Born in Ottawa, Ontario, Potvin, second cousin of Hall of Famer Denis Potvin, was selected by the Detroit Red Wings in the ninth round, 169th overall, in the 1986 NHL Entry Draft. During his career, he played for four different NHL teams: the Red Wings (1990–91 to 1991–92), Los Angeles Kings (1992–93 to 1993–94), Hartford Whalers (1993–94), and Boston Bruins (1994–95 to 1995–96). In 121 NHL games, he scored 3 goals and had 5 assists for 8 points. He also amassed 456 penalty minutes. In 13 NHL playoff games, he scored no goals, had one assist and 50 penalty minutes.

Coaching career
For the 1998–99 season, Potvin was the assistant coach for the Adirondack Red Wings of the American Hockey League. The next season, he made the jump to head coach for the Mississippi Sea Wolves of the ECHL. After only one season there, he became the head coach of the Springfield Falcons of the AHL, where he stayed for two seasons. Part way through the 2003–04 season, he took over the head coach position of the Adirondack IceHawks in the UHL. He would continue coaching the team (renamed the Adirondack Frostbite) in Glens Falls, New York.

Death
On January 13, 2006, Potvin was found dead in his hotel room in Kalamazoo, Michigan, hours before the Frostbite were to play the Kalamazoo Wings.  On February 10, Kalamazoo police announced that his death had been ruled a suicide. It was discovered that he had hanged himself with a belt from the shower rod in his hotel bathroom. He had a wife, son, and daughter.

Career statistics

Regular season and playoffs

References

External links
 
 

1967 births
2006 deaths
2006 suicides
Adirondack Red Wings coaches
Adirondack Red Wings players
Boston Bruins players
Bowling Green Falcons men's ice hockey players
Canadian ice hockey coaches
Canadian ice hockey right wingers
Detroit Red Wings draft picks
Detroit Red Wings players
Hartford Whalers players
Ice hockey people from Ottawa
Los Angeles Kings players
Portland Pirates players
Providence Bruins players
Springfield Falcons coaches
Suicides by hanging in Michigan
United Hockey League coaches